In enzymology, a formylmethanofuran-tetrahydromethanopterin N-formyltransferase is an enzyme that catalyzes the chemical reaction

formylmethanofuran + 5,6,7,8-tetrahydromethanopterin  methanofuran + 5-formyl-5,6,7,8-tetrahydromethanopterin

Thus, the two substrates of this enzyme are formylmethanofuran and 5,6,7,8-tetrahydromethanopterin, whereas its two products are methanofuran and 5-formyl-5,6,7,8-tetrahydromethanopterin.

This enzyme belongs to the family of transferases, specifically those acyltransferases transferring groups other than aminoacyl groups.  The systematic name of this enzyme class is formylmethanofuran:5,6,7,8-tetrahydromethanopterin 5-formyltransferase. Other names in common use include formylmethanofuran-tetrahydromethanopterin formyltransferase, formylmethanofuran:tetrahydromethanopterin formyltransferase, N-formylmethanofuran(CHO-MFR):tetrahydromethanopterin(H4MPT), formyltransferase, FTR, formylmethanofuran:5,6,7,8-tetrahydromethanopterin, and N5-formyltransferase.  This enzyme participates in folate biosynthesis.

Ftr from the thermophilic methanogen Methanopyrus kandleri (which has an optimum growth temperature 98 degrees C) is a hyperthermophilic enzyme that is absolutely dependent on the presence of lyotropic salts for activity and thermostability. The crystal structure of Ftr, determined to a reveals a homotetramer composed essentially of two dimers. Each subunit is subdivided into two tightly associated lobes both consisting of a predominantly antiparallel beta sheet flanked by alpha helices forming an alpha/beta sandwich structure. The approximate location of the active site was detected in a region close to the dimer interface. Ftr from the mesophilic methanogen Methanosarcina barkeri and the sulphate-reducing archaeon Archaeoglobus fulgidus have a similar structure.

In the methylotrophic bacterium Methylobacterium extorquens, Ftr interacts with three other polypeptides to form an Ftr/hydrolase complex which catalyses the hydrolysis of formyl-tetrahydromethanopterin to formate during growth on C1 substrates.

Structural studies

References

Further reading
 
 

Protein domains
EC 2.3.1
Enzymes of known structure